Christian Nenepath (21 April 1961 – 2008) was an Indonesian sprinter. He competed in the men's 100 metres at the 1984 Summer Olympics.

References

1961 births
2008 deaths
Athletes (track and field) at the 1984 Summer Olympics
Indonesian male sprinters
Olympic athletes of Indonesia
Sportspeople from North Sulawesi
Southeast Asian Games medalists in athletics
Southeast Asian Games gold medalists for Indonesia
Competitors at the 1985 Southeast Asian Games
20th-century Indonesian people